Fung Kai Hong (born 25 January 1986) is a former Hong Kong professional footballer. He played as a defender.

Career
Hong made his professional debut for Citizen when he played in Round 2, 1–0 loss to South China in the 2009–10 season. His first goal for the club, came later that season, when he netted in Citizen's 3–1 victory over Shatin.

He joined Pegasus in July 2012 after being released by Citizen. However, he was again released by the club after spending one season with them. He joined newly-promoted side Yuen Long on 17 June 2013.

International career
Hong has represented the Hong Kong national team on 2 separate occasions, against Bahrain, and once against Yemen, both during qualification for the 2011 Asian Cup, in which Hong Kong failed to qualify for, finishing last in their group.

References

External links
 

1986 births
Living people
Hong Kong footballers
Hong Kong international footballers
Hong Kong First Division League players
Hong Kong Premier League players
Citizen AA players
Yuen Long FC players
TSW Pegasus FC players
Association football defenders